The men's 10 metre platform diving competition at the 2010 Asian Games in Guangzhou was held on 26 November at the Aoti Aquatics Centre.

Schedule
All times are China Standard Time (UTC+08:00)

Results 
Legend
DNF — Did not finish
DNS — Did not start

Preliminary

Final

References 

Results
Results

Diving at the 2010 Asian Games